The 2018 II liiga was the 24th season of the II liiga, fourth-highest league for association football clubs in Estonia.

II Liiga North/East

2018 season

2018 II N/E Liiga consists of 14 different teams. Nine of them remain the same, two were promoted from III Liiga North, one from III Liiga South and two were relegated from higher divisions. Promoted teams were Põhja-Tallinna JK Volta, Tartu JK Welco II and Tartu JK Tammeka III and relegated teams were JK Sillamäe Kalev and Raasiku FC Joker.  These teams replaced Tartu FC Merkuur (dissolved), Tallinna JK Legion, Võru FC Helios and Lasnamäe FC Ajax (promoted) and Tallinna JK Legion II (transferred to II S/W Liiga). There were two name changes as well: Narva United FC is now JK Narva Trans II and Tartu JK Tammeka U19's new name is Tartu JK Tammeka III. Tallinna FC Levadia III is now named FCI Tallinn because of the merging of these two teams.

Clubs

The following clubs are competing in II liiga North/East during the 2018 season.

a – never been relegated from II liiga b – never played in Esiliiga B/Esiliiga c – ineligible for promotion to Esiliiga B

Results

League table

Results table

Statistics

Top scorers

Most viewed matches

Least viewed matches

Attendances

II Liiga South/West

2018 season

2018 II S/W Liiga consists of 14 different teams. Eight of them remain the same. Two were promoted from III Liiga West, one from III Liiga North and one from III Liiga East. They were Pärnu JK Poseidon, Läänemaa JK, JK Tallinna Kalev III and Paide Linnameeskond III. One team was transferred from II Liiga N/E. It was Tallinna JK Legion II. Remaining team was relegated from Esiliiga B, which was Viimsi JK. These teams replaced FC Nõmme United, Pärnu Jalgpalliklubi and FC Flora U19 (all promoted), Saue JK Laagri, SK Imavere and Viimsi JK II (all relegated). Also Tallinna JK Dünamo changed its name to Tallinna JK Legion II.

Clubs

The following clubs are competing in II liiga South/West during the 2018 season.

a – never been relegated from II liiga 
b – never played in Esiliiga B/Esiliiga 
c – ineligible for promotion to Esiliiga B

Results

League table

Results table

Statistics

Top scorers

Most viewed matches

Least viewed matches

Attendances

Post-Season

League winner

Promotion play-offs

Relegation play-offs

References

Football leagues in Estonia
4
Estonia
Estonia